was a Japanese daimyō of the Edo period, who ruled the Owari Domain. He was son of Tokugawa Narimasa with his concubine, Oren no Kata (1796-1871). His childhood name was Kanmaru (鑑丸).

References

1836 births
1849 deaths
Lords of Owari